If, Bwana is the pseudonym of the influential noise music artist Al Margolis.

History
Al Margolis has been working under the musical pseudonym If, Bwana since New Year's Day 1984. The moniker is an acronym for "It's Funny, But We Are Not Amused." He has since earned an international reputation for his experimental noise music.

Recording history
If, Bwana music is a fusion of ambient, industrial, and musique concrète sounds, often featuring strange soundscapes that are both balmy and unnerving at the same time.

Margolis has also been very active as the owner of two prolific labels, the cassette label Sound of Pig and, since the 1990s, Pogus Productions, a CD label with a focus on experimental contemporary classical music.

See also
Cassette culture
List of noise musicians
Noise music

References
Paul Hegarty, Noise/Music: A History (2007) Continuum International Publishing Group
Thurston Moore, Mix Tape: The Art of Cassette Culture (2004) Universe

Footnotes

Cassette culture 1970s–1990s
Living people
American experimental musicians
American noise musicians
Year of birth missing (living people)